Virgibacillus litoralis is a Gram-positive, moderately halophilic, endospore-forming, aerobic, rod-shaped and motile bacterium from the genus of Virgibacillus which has been isolated from saline soil.

References

Bacillaceae
Bacteria described in 2012